The 2012 World Junior Ringette Championships, (2012 WJRC) also known as the U19 2012 World Championships, was an international ringette tournament and the 2nd edition of the World Junior Ringette Championships organized by the International Ringette Federation (IRF). It was contested in London, Ontario, Canada, between December 29, 2012, and January 3, 2013. The junior tournament was organized exclusively for elite junior national ringette teams. Venues included the Western Fair Sports Centre. This was the last year the event was held separately from the World Ringette Championships. Afterwards a new U19 division was created at the 2013 World Ringette Championships and the junior tournament merged with the larger international program.

Video of the games were produced as webcasts by SportsCanada.TV, Canada's largest online amateur sports network. David Singh was the head coach for Team France and was also the head coach for the National Ringette League team, the Lac St. Louis Adrenaline for the 2012-13 season.

This tournament was the first and last time France and Russia would send national teams to compete at the international level with neither country having sent a national team to compete in either the senior or junior level since.

History
The U19 World Championships was a tournament organized by the International Ringette Federation (IRF) from 2009 to 2012 for elite international Junior ringette athletes. The World Junior Ringette Championships competition was run as a separate tournament from the World Ringette Championships which was designed for adult players. The World Junior Ringette Championships no longer function as a separate event, having since merged in 2013 with the main World Ringette Championships program where both Senior and Junior divisions now exist.

Venue
The tournament was contested in London, Ontario, Canada.

Teams

Final standings

Rosters

Team Finland Junior
The second appearance by Finland in world junior competition took place at the 2012 World Junior Ringette Championships. Unlike the previous world junior competition, Finland sent only one team to represent the country which was its first official junior national ringette team. The team consisted of nineteen athletes.

Team Canada Junior
Canada was represented by two different U19 junior teams: Team Canada East (Under-19), and Team Canada West (Under-19). Team Canada West (U19) competed with fifteen members from Alberta.

Three members of the Central Alberta U19 Sting, Meghan Kelly, Kirsten MacGregor and Cassidy Lemasurier, played for the U19 Team USA of 2012 to help fill out their roster.

Team Canada East

Team Canada West

Team USA Junior
An Under-19 (U19) USA Junior team was formed during the 2012 World Junior Ringette Championships using Canadian players to help represent the USA. Three members of the Central Alberta U19 Sting, Meghan Kelly, Kirsten MacGregor and Cassidy Lemasurier, played for the United States U19 national ringette team to help fill out their roster.

See also
 Canada national ringette team
 Finland national ringette team

References

Ringette competitions
Ringette
World Ringette Championships